Denis Ovens (born 1 July 1957 in Enfield) is an English retired professional darts player. He is nicknamed The Heat and is now based in Stevenage. Ovens is widely regarded as one of the most consistent players in the circuit, though he has as yet failed to convert his form from the circuit to the big stages on television. His constant second round exits in numerous televised tournaments has led him to be called by commentators as 'The Nearly Man'.

Career

His one good run came in the 2005 PDC World Darts Championship, reaching the quarter-finals before losing to former World Masters champion Mark Dudbridge. He has since suffered six successive second round exits in the World Championship – against Steve Alker in 2006, against Alan Tabern in 2007 (in a thriller that went to a sudden death deciding leg, with Ovens narrowly missing a double 12 for a perfect nine dart finish and a £15,000 bonus), in 2008 against Dutchman Jan van der Rassel, after defeating Colin Monk in the first round, in 2009 to Ronnie Baxter having defeated Steve Maish 3–0 in the first round, in 2010 to Colin Lloyd and in 2011 to Simon Whitlock. 

He reached the semi-final of the UK Open in three consecutive years from 2010 to 2012, where he was defeated by Phil Taylor (twice) and Wes Newton and reached the final of the inaugural German Darts Championship in 2007.

BDO

Ovens retired in 2015. Almost two years to the day since his last appearance, at the BDO Swedish Open in 2016, the 61-year-old made a comeback at the same event. He lost 2–4 to Veine Hagen in the last 256 of the Swedish Open Men's Singles, lost 0–3 to Willem Mandigers in the last 32 of the Gents Classic
and lost alongside Keith Wetton against Mauri Tuutijärvi and Ari Nevalainen in the last 16 of the Mens Pairs.

World Championship results

BDO

2000: 1st Round (lost to Bobby George 1–3)

PDC

2001: 1st round (lost to Les Fitton 1–3)
2002: 2nd round (lost to Richie Burnett 4–6)
2003: 3rd round (lost to Dennis Smith 1–5)
2004: 3rd round (lost to Alex Roy 3–4)
2005: Quarter-finals (lost to Mark Dudbridge 3–5)
2006: 2nd round (lost to Steve Alker 1–4)
2007: 2nd round (lost to Alan Tabern 3–4)
2008: 2nd round (lost to Jan van der Rassel 1–4)
2009: 2nd round (lost to Ronnie Baxter 1–4)
2010: 2nd round (lost to Colin Lloyd 3–4)
2011: 2nd round (lost to Simon Whitlock 0–4)
2012: 1st round (retired due to injury while trailing Kevin Münch 1–0)
2013: 2nd round (lost to Adrian Lewis 1–4)

Career statistics

(W) Won; (F) finalist; (SF) semifinalist; (QF) quarterfinalist; (#R) rounds 6, 5, 4, 3, 2, 1; (RR) round-robin stage; (Prel.) Preliminary round; (DNQ) Did not qualify; (DNP) Did not participate; (NH) Not held

Performance timeline

Trivia
Ovens is known for his trademark unshaven looks. Ovens stated on ESPN's World Series of Darts that he kept shaving before a darts match and always lost, so he thought "OK, don't shave".
Ovens is well known to darts fans as "Captain Hobo", in reference to his unkempt appearance.                 
Ovens has said he enjoys playing in German tournaments as Germany  "do good beer."

References

External links
Interview with Denis Ovens
Profile and stats on Darts Database

1957 births
English darts players
Living people
People from Enfield, London
Professional Darts Corporation former tour card holders
British Darts Organisation players
PDC ranking title winners